Steve White is a British skipper born in 1972 he finished 8th in the 2008-2009 Vendée Globe

References

External links
 Official Website 
 Official Facebook Page

1972 births
British male sailors (sport)
IMOCA 60 class sailors
British Vendee Globe sailors
2008 Vendee Globe sailors
Vendée Globe finishers
Single-handed circumnavigating sailors
Living people